is a passenger railway station located in the town of Yamakita, Kanagawa, Japan, operated by Central Japan Railway Company (JR Central).

Lines
Higashi-Yamakita Station is served by the Gotemba Line and is 13.1 kilometers from the terminus of the line at Kōzu Station.

Station layout
Higashi-Yamakita Station has a single side platform serving bidirectional traffic. The station is unattended.

History
Higashi-Yamakita Station opened on December 25, 1956 as a station of Japanese National Railways (JNR) Gotemba Line. On April 1, 1987 along with privatization and division of JNR, the station came under control of JR Central.

Station numbering was introduced to the Gotemba Line in March 2018; Higashi-Yamakita Station was assigned station number CB05.

Passenger statistics
In fiscal 2018, the station was used by an average of 793 passengers daily (boarding passengers only).

The passenger figures (boarding passengers only) for previous years are as shown below.

Surrounding area
Kanagawa Prefectural Yamakita High School

See also
List of railway stations in Japan

References

External links

 Gotemba Line Users' Association information 

Railway stations in Japan opened in 1956
Yamakita, Kanagawa